Nizhnepayva is a rural locality (a selo) in Nizhnechumansky Selsoviet of Bayevsky District, Altai Krai, Russia. The population was 294 as of 2015. There are 13 streets.

Geography 
Nizhnepayva is located on the bank of the Payva River, 39 km northwest of Bayevo (the district's administrative centre) by road. Verkh-Payva is the nearest rural locality.

Ethnicity 
The village is inhabited by Russians and others.

References 

Rural localities in Bayevsky District